Rhipidistia, also known as Dipnotetrapodomorpha, is a clade of lobe-finned fishes which includes the tetrapods and lungfishes. Rhipidistia formerly referred to a subgroup of Sarcopterygii consisting of the Porolepiformes and Osteolepiformes, a definition that is now obsolete. However, as cladistic understanding of the vertebrates has improved over the last few decades, a monophyletic Rhipidistia is now understood to include the whole of Tetrapoda and the lungfishes.

Rhipidistia includes Porolepiformes and Dipnoi. Extensive fossilization of lungfishes has contributed to many evolutionary studies of this group. Evolution of autostylic jaw suspension, in which the palatoquadrate bone fuses to the cranium, and the lymph pumping "lymph heart" (later lost in mammals and flying birds), are unique to this group.

The precise time at which the choana evolved is debated, with some considering early rhipidistians as the first choanates.

Etymology
Rhipidistia is from Ancient Greek ῥιπίδιον (rhipídion, “small bellows”)

Dipnotetrapodomorpha is from the Greek δίπνοος (dipnoos) with two breathing structures; and from δι- twice and πνοή breathing, breath; and from ancient Greek τετρα- (tetra-), combining form of the numeral τέτταρες (tettares), and ancient Greek -ποδ- (-pod-)the combining form of πούς (pous, foot); and ancient Greek -μορϕος (-morphos), combining form of μορϕή (morph) physical shape.

Relationships
The cladogram presented below is based on studies compiled by Philippe Janvier and others for the Tree of Life Web Project, and Swartz 2012.

References

External links
 palaeos.com page
 Taxonomicon page

Rhipidistians
Early Devonian first appearances
Vertebrate subclasses
Evolution of tetrapods